Kpedze Senior High School (also known as KPESCO) is a second cycle institution in Kpedze in the Ho West District in the Volta Region of Ghana. In March 2016, the school emerged as winners in a debate organized by the Evangelical Presbyterian University College.

History 
The school was established on 12 November 1962 and began with 10 boys and 5 girls making 15 students. In 2011, Mr. Gabriel Mawusi Aku was the headmaster of the school. In 2019, the headmaster of the school was Togbe Foe Tsali II. In 2020, the headmaster of the school was Mr. Gadotor Yram. In July 2022, the school were winners of the Volta Regional Renewable Energy Challenge hosted by the Energy Commission.

Notable past students 

 Mandy Wisdom Enyam known as Hyfi, an artist in Ho, Volta Region.
 Ernest Victor Apau, District Chief Executive for Ho West, Volta Region.
 Togbe Afede Asor II, predecessor of Togbe Afede XIV, Agbogbomefia of Asogli
 Dzifa Attivor, former politician and Deputy Minister for Transport.
 Mr Atsu Menyawovor, board chairman of the school

References 

High schools in Ghana
1962 establishments in Ghana
Education in Volta Region